R U Ready? is the second studio album recorded by South Korean girl group Lovelyz. It was released digitally and physically on February 26, 2017 by Woollim Entertainment and distributed by CJ E&M Music. The album was re-released under the title Now, We on May 2, 2017.

This album and its repackage are the second and third part of their 'Love' trilogy, the sequel to their previous EP A New Trilogy.

Background and release

R U Ready?

On January 17, 2017, it was confirmed that Lovelyz would be making their comeback in February. On February 7, Woollim Entertainment announced Lovelyz would be releasing their second studio album on February 27. On February 8, Lovelyz officially announced that their second studio album would be called R U Ready?. Lovelyz released teaser group on February 14 and individual teasers on February 20. On February 21, the album's tracklist was revealed and a reschedule for the album's release was brought forward to February 26 at 10:00 p.m. KST.

Now, We

On April 19, Woollim Entertainment announced that Lovelyz would be making a comeback in early-May. The next day, Lovelyz released "Peek Version" of prologue film for repackaged album titled Now, We, which would be released on May 2. A re-packaged edition of the album, Now, We, was officially released on May 2, 2017. This edition includes two new songs: "Now, We" and "Aya".

Music Video

WoW!

This music video inspired by The Art Of Pop Art & Cutout Animation, including dance and solo singing scene. The music video also have easter eggs like their picture from debut to familiar scenes of their previous music video like marbles from Destiny and most notable of all is a picture of Bulldaegal from South Korean punk band "No Brain" who's known as Lovelyz biggest fan.

Promotion
On February 9, 2017, Lovelyz shoot their first comeback variety show appearance on the Weekly Idol.

A promotional showcase for R U Ready? was held at Samsung Blue Square Hall, Seoul on February 27, 2017 with Super Junior's Heechul and Yoonsang as the MC. They began the album promotion on South Korean music television programs on March 2, 2017. Member Yein was absent from promotional activities due to an injury she sustained during the comeback practice. It was announced that member Yein had recovering from her injury and will be able to joining promotional activities started on March 23.

Track listing

Charts

Weekly charts

Year-end chart

Release history

References

2017 albums
Lovelyz albums
Woollim Entertainment albums
Stone Music Entertainment albums
Korean-language albums